Climate emergency declarations have been made by multiple jurisdictions in New Zealand, including national, regional and territorial authorities.
The first New Zealand´s jurisdictions began to declare climate emergencies in 2019.

National 
New Zealand's national government declared a climate emergency on 2 December 2020. Additionally, the New Zealand Government has committed to becoming neutral by 2025.

Regional councils

Territorial authorities

References

Emergency management in New Zealand
Climate change in New Zealand
Environmental law in New Zealand